is a Japanese women's professional shogi player ranked 1-dan.

Promotion history
Nakazawa's promotion history is as follows:

 2-kyū: April 1, 2015
 1-kyū: June 20, 2015
 1-dan: April 1, 2016

Note: All ranks are women's professional ranks.

Major titles and other championships
Nakazawa has yet to appear in a major title match, but she has won one official non-title women's professional shogi tournament.

References

External links
 ShogiHub: Nakazawa, Saya

1996 births
Living people
People from Ichinomiya, Aichi
Japanese shogi players
Women's professional shogi players
Professional shogi players from Aichi Prefecture
Meijo University alumni